Bartica Airport  is an airport serving the town of Bartica, in the Cuyuni-Mazaruni Region of Guyana.

See also

 List of airports in Guyana
 Transport in Guyana

References

External links
Bartica Airport
OpenStreetMap - Bartica
OurAirports - Bartica

Airports in Guyana